Brahmacharini (Sanskrit: ब्रह्मचारिणी) means a devoted female student who lives in an Ashrama with her Guru along with other students. She is the second aspect of the Navadurga forms of Mahadevi and is worshipped on the second day of Navaratri (the nine divine nights of Navadurga). The goddess Brahmacharini is an aspect of Parvati and wears white clothes, holding a japamala in her right hand and a kamandalu in her left.

Etymology

The word brahmacharini stems from two Sanskrit roots:
Brahma(ब्रह्म, shortened from Brahman), means "the one self-existent Spirit, the Absolute Reality, Universal Self, Personal God, the sacred knowledge".
charini is the feminine version of one who is a charya(चर्य), which means "occupation with, engaging, proceeding, behaviour, conduct, to follow, moving in, going after".

The word brahmacharini in Vedic texts means a female who pursues sacred religious knowledge.

Legend of Brahmacharini 

According to different versions of her story, maiden Parvati resolves to marry Shiva. Her parents try to discourage her, but she remains steadfast and performs a penance for about 5000 years. 

In the meantime, the gods approach Kamadeva, the Hindu god of love and lust, and ask him to generate desire in Shiva for Parvati. They are driven by an asura named Tarkasur who can only be killed by Shiva's child. Kamadeva shoots Shiva with an arrow of desire. Shiva opens his third eye in his forehead and burns Kama to ashes. 

Parvati does not lose her hope or her resolve to win over Shiva. She begins to live in mountains like Shiva and engage in the same activities he does, such as asceticism, yogin and tapas; it is this aspect of Parvati that is deemed to be that of goddess Brahmacharini. Her ascetic pursuit draws the attention of Shiva and awakens his interest. He meets her in disguised form and tries to dissuade her by counting Shiva's weaknesses and personality problems. Parvati refuses to listen and insists in her resolve. 

During this time, the demon named Prakandasura attacks Parvati with his million asuras. Parvati is at the last stage of completion for her tapas, and is unable to defend herself. Seeing Parvati helpless, goddesses Lakshmi and Saraswati intervene but are outnumbered by the demons. After many days of fighting, the kamandalu beside Parvati falls and all the demons are washed away in the resulting flood. At last, Parvati opens her eyes, emitting fire and burning the demon to ashes. 

Everyone in the universe is impressed by the tapas performed by Devi Parvati, except Shiva. Shiva at last visits Paravati in disguise of Bhramachari. He then examines Parvati by giving her riddles, which she all answers correctly. After praising Parvati for her brain and beauty, Brahmachari proposes to her. Parvati realizes he is Shiva and accepts. Shiva appears in his true form and finally accepts her and breaks her tapas. During the entire tapas Pravati was feeding herself with belpatra and river water.  

Her abode is in the Svadhishthana Chakra.  Brahmacharini signifies being unmarried and the colour white signifies purity.

Prayers 
Mantra of Brahmacharini:

ॐ देवी ब्रह्मचारिण्यै नम:

Oṃ Devī Brahmacāriṇyai Namaḥ

Prarthana or Prayer:

दधाना करपद्माभ्यामक्षमालाकमण्डलू। 

देवी प्रसीदतु मयि ब्रह्मचारिण्यनुत्तमा॥

या देवी सर्वभू‍तेषु माँ ब्रह्मचारिणी रूपेण संस्थिता।

नमस्तस्यै नमस्तस्यै नमस्तस्यै नमो नमः॥

Dadhana kara Padmabhyam akshamala kamandalu। 

Devi prasidathu mayi brahmacharinya-uttama॥

Ya Devi Sarvabhuteshu Maa Brahmacharini Rupena Samsthita।

Namastasyai Namastasyai Namastasyai Namo Namah॥

Temples 
 Maa Brahmacharini Devi Durga Mandir is located at Panchganga Ghat, Ghasi Tola, Varanasi, Uttar Pradesh 221001

Festival

Goddess Brahmacharini is worshipped on the second day of Navratri.

References

Hindu goddesses